Be Somebody may refer to:

 Be Somebody (2016 film), an American romantic comedy film
 Be Somebody (2021 film), a Chinese comedy mystery film
 "Be Somebody", a song by 3 Doors Down from the 2005 album Seventeen Days
 "Be Somebody", a 2020 song by Dillon Francis featuring Evie Irie
 "Be Somebody", a song by Fort Minor from the 2005 album The Rising Tied
 "Be Somebody", a song by Kings of Leon from the 2008 album Only by the Night
 "Be Somebody", a song by the Enemy from the 2009 album Music for the People
 "Be Somebody", a song by Thousand Foot Krutch from the 2012 album The End is Where We Begin

See also
 Be Somebody... or Be Somebody's Fool!, a 1984 motivational video helmed by Mr. T